The Trigonal: Fight for Justice is a 2018 Philippine action film written and directed by Vincent Soberano starring Rhian Ramos, Epy Quizon and Monsour Del Rosario. The film was distributed by Viva Films and it first released in Singapore during the film festival of Cannes Film Market and was released in the Philippines on September 26, 2018. It is the first Philippine film that uses all English.

Cast

References

External links

2018 films
Philippine action films
Viva Films films
2010s English-language films